31 Orionis is a binary star system in the equatorial constellation of Orion, located near the bright star Mintaka. It is visible to the naked eye as a faint, orange-hued point of light with a baseline apparent visual magnitude of 4.71. The distance to this system is approximately 490 light years away based on parallax, and it is drifting further away with a mean radial velocity of +6 km/s.

The brighter member, designated component A, is an aging giant star with a stellar classification of K5III. It is reported as a semi-regular variable with magnitude ranging from 4.68 to 4.72 over 141 days, although the General Catalogue of Variable Stars describes this as unconfirmed by subsequent observations. It has the variable star designation CI Orionis, while 31 Orionis is the Flamsteed designation. The magnitude 10.2 companion star, component B, is an F-type main-sequence star with a class of F7V.

References

K-type giants
K-type main-sequence stars
Binary stars

Orion (constellation)
BD-01 0913
Orionis, 31
036167
025737
1834
Orionis, CI